Myrne a village (selo) in Polohy Raion, Zaporizhia Oblast, Ukraine. In 2011, it had a population of 830.

It as founded as Jasseny  in 1928, and remained under that name until 1961.

References 

1928 establishments in Ukraine

Villages in Polohy Raion